St. Catharines is a federal electoral district in the Niagara Region of Ontario, Canada, that has been represented in the House of Commons of Canada since 1968.

It consists of the part of the City of St. Catharines lying east and north of a line drawn from Lake Ontario: Courtleigh Road, Third Street Louth, the QEW, Highway 406, First Street Louth, St. Paul Street West, St. Paul Crescent, Twelve Mile Creek, Glendale Avenue, Merrit Street and Glendale Avenue.

History
It was created in 1966 from parts of Lincoln riding.

It consisted initially of the part of the City of St. Catharines bounded on the east by the eastern city limit, and on the north, west and south by a line drawn from the city limit southwest along Eastchester Avenue, south along Bunting Road, southwest along Rockwood Street, south along Hartzell Road, northwest along the Canadian National Railway (CNR) line, south along Glengarry Road, east along Glendale Avenue, south along Mountain Street and east along Bradley Street to the city limit.

In 1976, it was redefined to consist of the part of the City of St. Catharines lying north of the Canadian National Railway.

In 1987, it was redefined to consist of the part of the City of St. Catharines lying north of a line drawn from west to east along St. Paul Street West, St. Paul Street West to St. Paul Crescent, the old Welland Canal, Carter Creek, the first Canadian National Railway spur line and the main CNR line and Queenston Street.

In 1996, it was redefined to consist of the part of the City of St. Catharines lying north and east of a line drawn from the western city limit along St. Paul Street West, St. Paul Crescent, the Old Welland Canal, Carter Creek, the first Canadian National Railway spur line, the most easterly Canadian National Railway spur line and the yard line to the southern city limit.

In 2003, it was given its current boundaries as described above.

This riding lost fractions of territory to Niagara West and Niagara Centre during the 2012 electoral redistribution.

Demographics 
According to the 2021 Canada Census

Ethnic groups: 80.7% White, 4.2% Black, 3.5% Indigenous, 2.4% Latin American, 2.2% South Asian, 1.4% Filipino, 1.3% Chinese, 1.2% Arab

Languages: 79.9% English, 2.1% Spanish, 1.8% French, 1.4% Italian, 1.3% German, 1.2% Arabic, 1.1% Polish

Religions: 58.3% Christian (25.7% Catholic, 6.1% Anglican, 4.2% United Church, 1.9% Presbyterian, 1.3% Anabaptist, 1.3% Christian Orthodox, 1.2% Baptist, 1.1% Lutheran, 1.1% Pentecostal, 14.4% Other), 3.1% Muslim, 36.2% None

Median income: $37,600 (2020)

Average income: $46,760 (2020)

Federal riding associations

Riding associations are the local branches of the national political parties:

Members of Parliament

This riding has elected the following members of the House of Commons of Canada:

Election results

See also
 List of Canadian federal electoral districts
 Past Canadian electoral districts

References

Notes

External links
Riding history from the Library of Parliament
 Campaign expense data from Elections Canada
 Elections Ontario  1999 results and 2003 results

Ontario federal electoral districts
Politics of St. Catharines
1966 establishments in Ontario